Interstitial granulomatous dermatitis with arthritis (IGDA) or Ackerman dermatitis syndrome is a skin condition that most commonly presents with symmetrical round-to-oval red or violet plaques on the flanks, armpits, inner thighs, and lower abdomen.

See also
 Skin lesion

References

External links 

Connective tissue diseases